Yeritsyan is an Armenian surname. Notable people with the surname include:

Nerses Yeritsyan (born 1971), Armenian politician
Varduhi Yeritsyan (born 1981), Franco-Armenian classical pianist

Armenian-language surnames